División Intermedia was one of the divisions that formed the Argentine football league system. Established by the Argentine Association in 1911 as the second level, teams that won the championship promoted directly to Primera División. With the creation of División Intermedia, Primera B become the third division.

Tournaments organised by dissident body Asociación Amateurs de Football (established in 1919) were named "Extra" in contrast with the "Intermedia" division by official Association. When both leagues merged in 1926, Segunda División became the second level again, and División Intermedia was moved to the third level of the league system. This lasted until 1932 when the Argentine Association eliminated two divisions (including División Intermedia) due to a restructuring of the system.

Division levels

List of champions
The División Intermedia was the second level of Argentine football (1911–26) then becoming the third (1927–32) until its dissolution.

Notes

See also
 Primera B Metropolitana
 Argentine football league system

References

I
I
I
I